is a Japanese female professional squash player who represents Japan women's national squash team internationally. She achieved her highest career PSA world ranking of 127 in January 2018 during the 2017-18 PSA World Tour.

Career 
She entered the Professional Squash Association in 2017 and competed in the Nissan Open Championships as a part of the 2016-17 PSA World Tour. Her best result at a PSA World Tour came at the Greater Bendigo International Open 2019 which was part of the 2019–20 PSA World Tour where she reached quarterfinals of the event and lost to Australia's Sarah Cardwell.

She was part of the Japanese squad which competed at the Women's World Team Championships in 2012, 2016 and in 2018. Risa also represented Japan at the 2018 Asian Games, making her Asian Games debut appearance and claimed a bronze medal with the team in the women's team event at the 2018 Asian Games along with Misaki Kobayashi and Satomi Watanabe. At the 2019 Women's Asian Individual Squash Championships, she progressed to round two of the event and lost to Malaysia's Wen Li Lai.

References

External links 
 
 

1994 births
Living people
Japanese female squash players
Asian Games bronze medalists for Japan
Asian Games medalists in squash
Squash players at the 2018 Asian Games
Medalists at the 2018 Asian Games
Sportspeople from Tokyo